Glencoe station is a railway station in Glencoe, Illinois, United States.

Glencoe station may also refer to:

 Glencoe station (Ontario), a railway station in Glencoe, Ontario, Canada
 Glencoe station, a closed railway station in Glencoe, New South Wales, Australia
 Glencoe Station, a pastoral lease in Queensland, Australia